Giulio Cappelli (4 March 1911 – 16 December 1995) was an Italian footballer who played as a forward. He competed in the 1936 Summer Olympics with the Italy national football team, winning a gold medal in the tournament.

Club career
Born in La Spezia, Cappelli began his football career with local side Spezia. He joined Serie A side Livorno for two seasons beginning in 1933. The next season, he transferred to Serie B club F.C. Esperia Viareggio. Cappelli returned to Serie A with S.S.D. Sporting Lucchese and finished his playing career with Spezia.

International career
Cappelli made two appearances for Italy in 1936, scoring one goal. He was a member of the Italian Olympic team, which won the gold medal in the 1936 Olympic football tournament.

Death
On 16 December 1995, Cappelli died at his home in Marina di Massa aged 84.

Honours

International 
Italy
Olympic Gold Medal: 1936

References

External links
profile
profile

1911 births
1995 deaths
Italian footballers
Serie A players
Serie B players
Spezia Calcio players
U.S. Livorno 1915 players
S.S.D. Lucchese 1905 players
U.S. Massese 1919 players
Footballers at the 1936 Summer Olympics
Olympic footballers of Italy
Olympic gold medalists for Italy
Italy international footballers
Italian football managers
S.S.D. Lucchese 1905 managers
Inter Milan managers
Catania S.S.D. managers
U.S. Alessandria Calcio 1912 managers
Olympic medalists in football
Medalists at the 1936 Summer Olympics
Association football forwards